Ticks, also known as Infested, is a 1993 direct-to-video horror film directed by Tony Randel and starring Peter Scolari, Seth Green, Rosalind Allen, Ami Dolenz, Alfonso Ribeiro, and Clint Howard.

Plot
Drug dealer Jarvis Tanner uses steroids to enhance marijuana plants. Run-off from his operation has mutated the local ticks. Tyler Burns is sent to join an inner-city wilderness project in an attempt to conquer his fear of the woods, led by Holly Lambert and Charles Danson. Tyler meets his fellow campers Darrel “Panic” Lumley, Charles’ daughter Melissa, Dee Dee Davenport, Rome Hernandez, and Kelly Mishimoto.

They stop at a store to get supplies. While there, Melissa is confronted by Sir and Jerry, two locals. Jerry harasses Melissa, but is told to leave her alone by Sir. Jarvis’ hamster is killed by a tick. When Jarvis investigates, he is attacked by a tick before stepping into a bear trap and has several tick eggs drop on him.

The group arrives at camp. While in their cabin, Tyler, Panic, and Rome discover a tick egg, which Tyler destroys. While taking a hike, Melissa is attacked by a tick which Tyler fends off. When Tyler and Melissa inform Charles, he dismisses them. Panic’s dog Brutus is attacked and killed by another tick. Upset, Panic leaves camp. Tyler takes Brutus’s body to a veterinarian, who discovers a tick inside Brutus. The tick, still alive, runs around the room until the veterinarian kills it.

Panic, while walking in the woods, is attacked by a tick. He pulls most of it off, but its head burrows inside him. While fishing, Kelly and Mellissa discover Sheriff Parker’s corpse. Didi finds Jarvis, who has amputated his legs and had ticks burrow inside him. Jarvis is caught in another bear trap and his face explodes, causing a tick to latch on to Didi, but Tyler kills it. Panic stumbles onto Sir and Jerry’s marijuana farm, and Sir shoots Panic, but accidentally causes a propane tank to explode, causing a forest fire.

The group takes shelter from the raging fire in the cabin. Charles lets Sir and Jerry in, but a wounded Panic arrives and tells the group that Sir shot him before dying. Sir shoots Charles while Jerry attempts to take the van. A tick kills Jerry, who crashes the car into the cabin, injuring Sir. A large tick emerges from Panic’s corpse and mauls Sir. Tyler drives the van outside the window, but the large tick attacks Rome. Tyler lights it on fire, killing it, and the survivors drive back into civilization. At a junkyard, a pulsating tick egg falls from underneath the van.

Cast

Production
Doug Beswick came up with the idea for the film and supervised the special effects as well as being the associate producer of the film. The film was shot in Big Bear Lake, California.

Home Media
Ticks was first released direct-to-video in 1994 by Republic Pictures and later Olive Films on DVD and Blu-ray in 2013. It ran for 85 minutes. Vinegar Syndrome licensed and released the film on 4K Blu-ray and Blu-ray in October 2021, featuring an all new 4K scan of the interpositive film element. It was discovered the film's original runtime was 94 minutes, containing 9 minutes of footage unseen on television and all previous home video releases. The release also includes a series of extras such as commentaries, making-of documentary, and more.

References

External links
 
 

1993 direct-to-video films
1993 horror films
1993 films
American natural horror films
American direct-to-video films
1990s English-language films
Films shot in Big Bear Lake, California
Films shot in Los Angeles
American independent films
Films directed by Tony Randel
Direct-to-video horror films
Films scored by Daniel Licht
American films about cannabis
Films about arthropods
1990s American films